The coat of arms of Suriname was adopted on November 25, 1975. The motto reads Justitia – Pietas – Fides (“Justice – Piety – Fidelity”). It consists of two indigenous men carrying a shield; a trade ship on the water representing Suriname's colonial past as a source of cash crops and its present day involvement in international commerce; the royal palm represents both the rainforest that covers two-thirds of the country and the country's involvement in agribusiness; the diamond represents the mining industry; the star symbolizes the five continents from which the inhabitants of Suriname immigrated.

References

Suriname
National symbols of Suriname
Suriname
Suriname
Suriname
Suriname
Suriname